Vladimir Alexandrovich Cherkassky (13 April 1821 – 3 March 1878) was a slavophil Russian politician and first head of the provisional Russian Administration in Bulgaria.

Biography
Born into a princely family, Cherkassky studied law at Moscow State University. He supported the Emancipation reform of 1861 which abolished serfdom in Russia.

References

External links

Vladimir Cherkassky in the Brockhaus and Efron Encyclopedic Dictionary at wikisource.org

1821 births
1878 deaths
Mayors of Moscow